One Pair Of Eyes is a British current affairs documentary programme, which was first broadcast on the 5 May 1967 on BBC Two. The episodes were broadcast sporadically, usually once a month, with each episode presented by a different person, and focused on a subject that they care about. Those subjects could be controversial, according to David Attenborough who commissioned the series, as he was BBC Two's director of programmes at the time.

The presenters were highly thought of, and from a wide range of fields which included: TV broadcasters, radio broadcasters, newspaper editors, magazine editors, journalists, foreign correspondents, writers, authors, novelists, biographers, travel writers, poets, humourists, satirists, artists, cartoonists, sculptors, painters, illustrators, animators, photographers, scientists, physicists, physicians, professors, doctors, gerontologists, pathologists, paediatricians, psychoanalysts, psychologists, astronomers, historians, academics, headmasters, teachers, lecturers, politicians, diplomats, trade union leaders, activists, campaigners, architects, production designers, theatre directors, artistic directors, playwrights, dramatists, film directors, screenwriters, actors, comedians, singers, musicians, composers, critics, barristers, businessmen, military men, governor-generals, farmers, factory workers, chefs, curators, religious ministers, explorers, parliamentary peers, and barons.

Episodes

References

External links 

 BBC Programme Page - One Pair of Eyes
 BBC iPlayer - One Pair of Eyes
 

1967 British television series debuts
1984 British television series endings
1960s British documentary television series
1970s British documentary television series
1980s British documentary television series
BBC television documentaries
Television series by BBC Studios
English-language television shows
Current affairs shows